Children's Hospital is a British television fly-on-the-wall documentary series based at the Sheffield Children's Hospital, Birmingham Children's Hospital, and Alder Hey Children's Hospital in Liverpool. It was broadcast on BBC One between October 1993 and February 2003.

Production
According to scholar Annette Hill, the series had "all the hallmarks of a docu-soap", saying its "personal, melodramatic stories appeal to viewers, with more than 8 million tuning into the first series, despite widespread criticism from the press." Peter Lee-Wright observes that the series marked a transition in fly-on-the-wall documentaries by shifting the emphasis from the practical considerations onto the "human dramas being played out ... [capturing] the pain of the children ... and their parents' rollercoaster rides."

Music
The theme music was composed by Debbie Wiseman. The music was released as a CD single in 1997, containing full orchestral and piano versions of the theme, alongside the shorter versions used for the opening and closing sequences. The orchestral version was also released on the compilation album World of Sound. A new solo piano performance, titled "Ray of Sunshine", of the theme was included on the 2011 album Wiseman: Piano Stories.

Transmissions

Series

Specials

Further reading

References

1993 British television series debuts
2003 British television series endings
1990s British documentary television series
2000s British documentary television series
1990s British medical television series
2000s British medical television series
BBC television documentaries
Television shows set in Birmingham, West Midlands
Television shows set in Liverpool
Television shows set in Sheffield